A precedence graph, also named conflict graph and serializability graph, is used in the context of concurrency control in databases.

The precedence graph for a schedule S contains:
 A node for each committed transaction in S
 An arc from Ti to Tj if an action of Ti precedes and conflicts with one of Tj's actions. That is the actions belong to different transactions, at least one of the actions is a write operation, and the actions access the same object (read or write).

Precedence graph examples

Example 1

Example 2
       

A precedence graph of the schedule D, with 3 transactions. As there is a cycle (of length 2; with two edges) through the committed transactions T1 and T2, this schedule (history) is not Conflict serializable.
Notice, that the commit of Transaction 2 does not have any meaning regarding the creation of a precedence graph.

Testing Serializability with Precedence Graph

Algorithm to test Conflict Serializability of a Schedule S along with an example schedule.

or

      

 For each transaction Tx participating in schedule S, create a node labeled Ti in the precedence graph. Thus the precedence graph contains  T1, T2, T3.
 For each case in S where Tj executes a read_item(X) after Ti executes a write_item(X), create an edge (Ti → Tj) in the precedence graph. This occurs nowhere in the above example, as there is no read after write.
 For each case in S where Tj executes a write_item(X) after Ti executes a read_item(X), create an edge (Ti → Tj) in the precedence graph. This results in a directed edge from T1 to T2 (as T1  has R(A) before T2 having W(A)).
 For each case in S where Tj executes a write_item(X) after Ti executes a write_item(X), create an edge (Ti → Tj) in the precedence graph. This results in directed edges from T2 to T1, T2 to T3 and T1 to T3.
 The schedule S is serializable if and only if the precedence graph has no cycles. As T1 and T2 constitute a cycle, the above example is not (conflict) serializable.

References

External links
 The Fundamentals of Database Systems, 5th Edition the use of precedence graphs is discussed in chapter 17, as they relate to tests for conflict serializability.
 Abraham Silberschatz, Henry Korth, and S. Sudarshan. 2005. Database System Concepts (5 ed.), PP. 628–630. McGraw-Hill, Inc., New York, NY, USA.

Database management systems

el:Γράφος Σειριοποιησιμότητας
ru:Граф предшествования